The Women's 80 metres hurdles at the 1952 Summer Olympics took place on July 24 and July 25 at the Helsinki Olympic Stadium. Australian athlete Shirley Strickland de la Hunty earned the gold medal, setting new World and Olympic records.

Summary
Suffering from skin boils, defending champion Fanny Blankers-Koen was dropping out of other events to save herself for this event.  In the first heat, Shirley Strickland set the Olympic record at 11.0.  Strickland improved upon that with a 10.8 in the semi final round, joined by Maria Sander and Jean Desforges also running 10.9.  It would have been a world record race but instead was wind aided.

In the final, Blankers-Koen blasted out to a clear early lead over the first hurdle.  Still leading she hit the second hurdle hard and was knocked off stride.  She quit after jumping the third hurdle, this was the last race of her career.  Meanwhile Strickland was left with a metre lead on the closest chaser Sander.  At the sixth hurdle, Sander lost her stride and struggled, leaving Maria Golubnichaya in silver position but more than 2 metres behind Strickland.  And those positions held, Strickland well ahead of Golubnichaya, a slowing Sander leaning across the finish line to hold off her teammate Anneliese Seonbuchner for bronze.

Results

Heats
The first round was held on July 23. The two fastest runners qualified for the semifinals.

Heat 1

Heat 2

Heat 3

Heat 4

Heat 5

Heat 6

Semifinals
The semifinals were held on the July 23, the same day as the preliminary round. The first three runners from each heat qualified for the final.

Heat 1

Heat 2

Final
The final was held on July 24.

References

Athletics at the 1952 Summer Olympics
Sprint hurdles at the Olympics
1952 in women's athletics
Women's events at the 1952 Summer Olympics